Michael Byrne (born 1978) is an Irish retired hurler who played for East Cork club Killeagh. He played for the Cork senior hurling team for two seasons, during which time he usually lined out as a centre-forward.

References

1978 births
Living people
Killeagh hurlers
Cork inter-county hurlers